Glen Hope Covered Bridge is a historic wooden covered bridge located in Elk Township, Chester County, Pennsylvania.  It is a  Burr truss bridge, constructed in 1889. It has vertical planking and eave-level window openings. It crosses Little Elk Creek.

It was listed on the National Register of Historic Places in 1980.

References 
 

Covered bridges on the National Register of Historic Places in Pennsylvania
Covered bridges in Chester County, Pennsylvania
Bridges completed in 1889
Wooden bridges in Pennsylvania
Bridges in Chester County, Pennsylvania
National Register of Historic Places in Chester County, Pennsylvania
Road bridges on the National Register of Historic Places in Pennsylvania
Burr Truss bridges in the United States
1889 establishments in Pennsylvania